The Ryukyu shrew  (Crocidura orii), also known as Orii's shrew, is a species of mammal in the family Soricidae. It is endemic to Japan. It is threatened by habitat loss.

Sources

References 

Crocidura
Endemic fauna of the Ryukyu Islands
Endangered fauna of Asia
Mammals described in 1924
Taxa named by Nagamichi Kuroda
Species endangered by habitat loss
Taxonomy articles created by Polbot